The 2021 International Champions Cup Women's Tournament was a friendly tournament of women's association football matches. It was the third edition of the Women's International Champions Cup and took place in Portland, Oregon, United States, from August 18 to 21, 2021. Portland Thorns FC emerged the winners, defeating Olympique Lyonnais Féminin 1-0 in the final, while FC Barcelona Femení won the third-place match.

Teams
On the basis of their results in 2020, four teams participated in the tournament.

Venue

Bracket

Matches

Semi-finals

Third place play-off

Final

See also
Women's Champions League (UEFA)
National Women's Soccer League (United States)
Primera División (Spain)
Division 1 (France)

References

External links

2021 Women
2021 in women's association football
2021 in American women's soccer
August 2021 sports events in the United States